Georgios Dervisis (born 30 October 1994) is a water polo player of Greece. He was part of the Greek team winning the bronze medal at the 2015 World Aquatics Championships.

He was a member of the team that competed for Greece at the 2016 Summer Olympics. They finished in 6th place.

He plays for Greek powerhouse Olympiacos, with whom he won the 2017–18 LEN Champions League.

See also
 List of World Aquatics Championships medalists in water polo

References

External links
 

Greek male water polo players
Olympiacos Water Polo Club players
Living people
Place of birth missing (living people)
1994 births
World Aquatics Championships medalists in water polo
Water polo players at the 2016 Summer Olympics
Olympic water polo players of Greece
Mediterranean Games silver medalists for Greece
Mediterranean Games medalists in water polo
Competitors at the 2018 Mediterranean Games
Water polo players at the 2020 Summer Olympics
Medalists at the 2020 Summer Olympics
Olympic silver medalists for Greece
Olympic medalists in water polo
Water polo players from Athens